Esin is a Turkish word, given name, and surname and African common word.

Esin in Turkish means "inspiration, afflatus" or "morning breeze", where the root of the word "es-" means "to blow" or "to come into one's mind". Oldest literary source of the word is Divan-i Lugat-it Türk (1070). 

Ẹsin in Yoruba (a pluricentric language spoken principally in Benin and Nigeria, with communities in other parts of Africa, the Americas, and Europe) means "religion" as adopted in the name for one of the Muslim World leading and long running portal EsinIslam.Com (i.e. Esin Islam or Ẹsin Islam meaning Religion of Islam) which is managed and administered by students and followers of African-British Muslim scholar, Sheikh Dr. Abu-Abdullah Adelabu.

Notable people with the name and surname in Turkish include:

 Esin Afşar (1936-2011), Turkish singer and stage artist
 Esin Atıl (1937-2020), Turkish-American curator
 Esin Engin (1945–1997), Turkish musician, composer, arranger and film actor
 Esin Sağdıç (born 1988), Turkish handballer
 Esin Turan (born 1970), Austrian-Turkish painter and sculptor 
 Esin Varan (born 1988), Turkish television series actress

Turkish unisex given names